The Bronze Cross Medal is a single grade military decoration of the Armed Forces of the Philippines which is awarded for "heroism involving risk of life" under conditions not warranting the award of the Gold Cross Medal. It may be awarded for: 1) voluntary action in the face of great danger above and beyond the call of duty; or 2) other deeds evidenced by extraordinary bravery not involving direct combat with the enemy.

It is awarded by the Chief of Staff of the Armed Forces of the Philippines (AFP), the commanders of Philippine Army, Philippine Navy (PN), and Philippine Air Force (PAF), AFP wide Support Services Units, Area Commands, division and brigade commanders and their equivalent in the PAF and the PN.  Those eligible for the medal are military and civilian personnel of the AFP.  Members of the armed forces of allied countries may also be honored by the award of the Bronze Cross Medal if they meet the award criteria.

Description
The medal is a gold Greek cross.  Centered over the cross is a green laurel wreath tied at its base.  In the center, on the horizontal arms of the cross, is a golden bar engraved with the word “BRAVERY”.

The cross is suspended from a blue ribbon with a red central stripe edged in white and narrow white side stripes, halfway to the edges.

See also
 Awards and decorations of the Armed Forces of the Philippines

References

Citations

Bibliography
 The AFP Adjutant General, AFP Awards and Decorations Handbook, 1995, 1997, OTAG.

Military awards and decorations of the Philippines